Zinsser is a surname. Notable people with the surname include:

Frederick G. Zinsser, American businessman
Hans Zinsser (1878–1940), American physician, bacteriologist and writer
Judith Zinsser (born 1943), American historian and writer
William Zinsser (1922–2015), American writer, editor, literary critic and teacher

See also
Zinser
Rust-Oleum, for the owner of the paint brand.